Orleans County is the name of several counties in the United States:

 Orleans County, New York
 Orleans County, Vermont 
 Orleans Parish, Louisiana (Louisiana's divisions are called parishes, a county equivalent.)